Lynn Tomlinson is an animator and artist. She is a professor at Towson University. She lives in Baltimore, MD, with her husband, Craig J Saper, and her family.  She holds degrees from Cornell University (BA, English), the University of the Arts (MA, Art Education), the Annenberg School at the University of Pennsylvania (MA, Communication), and Towson University (MFA, Studio Art). She has taught at Cornell University, the University of the Arts in Philadelphia, Maryland Institute College of Art, and Delaware College of Art and Design, Richard Stockton College, and Tufts University. Her films have been screened at film festivals around the world over the past two decades. She has received awards and grants including several Mid-Atlantic Emmys, an ITVS production grant, and Individual Artist Fellowships from the State Arts Councils of Pennsylvania, Florida, and Maryland.

Filmography 
Both Sides Now (Clay-on-glass, 1998) – 1 min. Segment for A Little Curious on HBO Family.
P's Please (Clay-on-glass, 1996) – 45 secs. Short film for Sesame Street.
WHYY-TV – In the 1990s she created numerous short station IDs for WHYY-TV in Philadelphia and other shorts for ITVS that have been televised nationally, e.g., Frog Harmony
MTV Free Your Mind Spot (Clay-on-glass, 1994) – 30 secs. Produced, directed and animated a 30-second spot for MTV.
Cauldron (Clay-on-glass, 1994) – 5 mins. Funded by Pittsburgh Filmmakers Mid-Atlantic Region Media Arts Fellowship, the Pennsylvania Council on the Arts, and PIFVA Subsidy Grant. Screened at Philadelphia Festival of World Cinema and the Festival of Independents.
Paper Walls (1993) – Mixed live action and multi-media animation, 6 mins. Spotlight film for WHYY, based on Charlotte Perkins Gilman's story.
I Heard a Fly Buzz When I Died  – 1.5 minutes, based on Emily Dickinson's poem of the same name.
The Ballad of Holland Island House (2014) – 04:20
The Elephant's Song (2018) – 07:40

Media art projects 
Hannibal Square Community Mosaic Project – A community-based art project working with children and artists from the Crealde School of Art, to celebrate the history of Hannibal Square in Winter Park, FL.
Folkvine – Film and interactive documentaries of Florida folk artists. Tomlinson is the videographer and editor.
Girls of the World – Five fifth grade girls made animated stories from the history of girlhood. Tomlinson was the producer and creative director of the project.
Shopping for Utopia – Elementary school kids give animated tours of utopian societies that they designed. Tomlinson was the producer and creative director for this project. One of the tours features work by her son, Sam Saper.
Boxed In – 1996 ArtFronts project funded a storefront installation in center-city Phila., Sept.-Nov. 1996. Collaboration with sculptor Bill Tomlinson. A -long man crouched in the store window, holding a television monitor that captured the images of the passers-by. Reviews appeared in the Philadelphia Inquirer, The City Paper, and the Philadelphia Forum.

References 

American animators
American animated film directors
American women animators
Cornell University alumni
Cornell University faculty
Living people
American documentary filmmakers
Year of birth missing (living people)
American women academics
21st-century American women
American women documentary filmmakers